The 1929–30 Torquay United F.C. season was Torquay United's third season in the Football League and their third consecutive season in Third Division South.  The season runs from 1 July 1929 to 30 June 1930.

Overview
Needing a replacement for Percy Mackrill, who had left the club before the end of the previous season, Torquay United appointed former Birmingham City full back Frank Womack as their new manager.  Womack soon set about putting a together a new squad in an effort to improve upon the lowly finishes of Torquay's first two seasons in the League.  Debutants on the opening day of the season included centre half Harry Bruce, inside forward Harry Keeling and the ex-Sheffield United FA Cup winner David Mercer.  However, the Magpies made a slow start to the campaign, losing their opening four games, and it was not until the introduction of forwards Joe Pointon and Les Robinson that results slowly began to improve.  Effectively displacing Keeling and United mainstay Dan Kelly from the team, Pointon and Robinson ended up scoring a total of 34 goals between them by the end of the season.  Robinson became the first Torquay player to score four goals in a League match in the 5–2 win over Walsall in November and, not to be outdone, Pointon repeated the feat in a famous 7–0 victory over Bournemouth & Boscombe Athletic the following March.  Indeed, it was Pointon and Robinson who scored the goals at Gillingham to secure Torquay's first and only away win of the season.

However, United's fortunes took a turn for the worse in the New Year when a January storm tore off the entire roof of the Grandstand at Plainmoor.  With Torquay's finances already in a perilous state, there was a real possibility of the club going out of business altogether.  But, with the help of public donations and some hastily arranged friendlies, Torquay just about managed to avoid financial ruin, although a run of three consecutive 5–0 defeats to Clapton Orient, Brentford and Brighton did not help to improve the spirits of the team or its supporters.

Nevertheless, reason for optimism arrived with that emphatic 7–0 win over Bournemouth at Plainmoor.  The match marked the debut of a 17-year-old winger from Dartmouth named Ralph Birkett.  Although only making a handful of appearances for the Magpies before the end of the season, he would eventually become one of the finest players ever to appear for Torquay United.  Ironically, the match also saw the final appearance of another local hero Sid Cann.  The Torquay born full back had put in some impressive performances since joining United and the club had no option but to accept an offer to sell the young defender, as well as fellow full back Fred Corbett, to First Division side Manchester City.

Despite the emphatic win over Bournemouth, Torquay were still struggling at the bottom of the table as the season drew to a close.  Defeat in the final game of the season against local rivals Exeter City would have seen United again having to apply for re-election to the Football League.  As it was, a 2–1 victory over the Grecians was enough to see Torquay finish in 19th place, only narrowly avoiding the need for re-election.

Although, safe for another season, it was clear that Frank Womack and Torquay United still had plenty of hard work ahead of them.

League statistics

Third Division South

Results summary

Results by round

Match of the season
TORQUAY UNITED 7–0 BOURNEMOUTH & BOSCOMBE ATHLETICThird Division SouthPlainmoor, 8 March 1930 

Having not won a match since the previous December, few would have expected Torquay United (currently lying 19th in the Third Division South table) to get much out of the visit of 6th placed Bournemouth & Boscombe Athletic.  The Plainmoor faithful had already witnessed a 5–0 thrashing from Clapton Orient back in January, and the travelling fans were treated to two more defeats by the same scoreline in their next two away matches.  Not many then would have been expecting the Magpies to record their biggest League victory to date when the Cherries came to town.

Helping himself to four of the seven goals that day was centre forward Joe Pointon, doubling his tally for the season so far, although he would go on to score another ten goals before the end of the campaign.  Dan Kelly and Harry Waller scored the other three between them while the Torquay defence held firm behind them, despite the 41-year-old Frank Womack selecting himself at right back.  (In fact, this was manager Womack's sixth match in succession and he ended up playing in every game for the rest of the season, even appearing as an inside forward when Torquay were themselves victims of a 7–0 humiliation at Walsall in April).

The match also has a unique place in history as it was the only time that two of Torquay's greatest ever home-grown players appeared together.  Born in Babbacombe, Sid Cann had joined the Magpies the previous season at the age of 16 and quickly developed into an extremely effective full back, eventually displacing the more experienced Willie Brown from the team.  In his second season, he had proved his versatility by being able to fill in at centre half, a role he fulfilled in this game.  Unfortunately, this was to be Cann's last match for the Magpies before leaving for Manchester City.  Ironically, the same game saw the debut of another local lad with Ralph Birkett, a 17-year-old amateur from Dartmouth United, appearing on the right wing.  Birkett had a storming debut for Torquay setting up four of United's goals and the youngster signed a professional contract with the club shortly afterwards.  While Cann's move to a First Division side was a major accomplishment for a Torquay player, Birkett would go on to eclipse his achievements when, after three full seasons for United, he would sign for Arsenal and then Middlesbrough before eventually appearing for England in 1935.

Results

Third Division South

FA Cup

Club statistics

First team appearances

Source:

Top scorers

Source:

Transfers

In

Out

Source:

References

External links

Torquay United F.C.
Torquay United F.C. seasons